Suryadharma Ali is an Indonesian politician who was the president of the United Development Party from 2007 to 2014 as well as Minister of Religious Affairs from 2009 to 2014 under then-president Susilo Bambang Yudhoyono.

During his time in office Suryadharma was seen as a religious traditionalists who was often unwilling to compromise on issues. As religious affairs minister Suryadharma was unwilling to extend government recognition to the Baháʼí Faith, a minority group in the country.

In May 2014 Suryadharma was indicted in a corruption scandal involving illicit use of funds intended for the hajj. In 2018 Suryadharma was convicted and ordered to pay 27 billion RS to the state. He was sentenced for 6 years in jail and fined 300 million rupiah. Shortly after being accused in 2014 Suryadharma resigned as minister of religious affairs.

References

1956 births
Living people
Politicians from Jakarta
Government ministers of Indonesia
United Development Party politicians
Chairmen of the United Development Party
Indonesian politicians convicted of corruption
Syarif Hidayatullah State Islamic University Jakarta alumni